Fuaad Al-Mutairi (born August 1, 1986) is a Saudi football player who plays a midfielder.

References

1986 births
Living people
Saudi Arabian footballers
Al-Hazem F.C. players
Al-Raed FC players
Al-Kholood Club players
Place of birth missing (living people)
Saudi First Division League players
Saudi Professional League players
Saudi Second Division players
Saudi Fourth Division players
Association football midfielders